Hala Badri, Arabic: هالة بدري is the Director General of Dubai Culture and Arts Authority. She was appointed to the role in 2019 and has previously worked in several other sectors, including oil, sustainability and marketing. 

Prior to her appointment to Dubai Culture, she was Executive Vice President of Brand and Communications of du, the second largest telecommunications company in the UAE. Under her leadership, Du was the first Emirati organisation to use Twitter to solve customer complaints. 

She is also a former senior advisor to the Abu Dhabi National Oil Company (ADNOC).

Education 
Hala Badri is a certified director having completed the International Directors Program with INSEAD and holds an MBA in Managing e-Business from Zayed University, and a Higher Diploma in Communications Technology (Journalism) from The Higher Colleges of Technology, from which she graduated with Distinction and Highest Honor. 

Hala also completed the UAE Government Leaders Program in 2019 and the Sheikh Mohammed Bin Rashid Leadership Development Program in 2007.

Career 
In April 2019, Hala Badri was appointed as the Director General of Dubai Culture and Arts Authority by a royal decree from His Highness Sheikh Mohammed Bin Rashid Al Maktoum, Vice President and Prime Minister of the UAE and Ruler of Dubai, following 20 years of an impressive path in dynamic business sectors critical to the UAE’s economic development: telecommunications, oil & gas, media and real estate. 

A passionate marketer, a technology enthusiast, transforming businesses through innovation and her exemplary managerial qualities, she is able to capably spearhead the achievement of Dubai Culture’s strategic objectives.

Hala Badri encourages and supports community cultural activities that contribute to the development of the environment and infrastructure of Dubai's cultural and creative industries, as well as the integration of culture into the public sector. The most prominent activities are:

·        Emirates Airline Festival of Literature 

·        Al Quoz Creative Zone 

·        Dubai Art Season 

·        Dubai Design Week 

·        Dubai Watch Week 

·        Sikka Art & Design Festival 

Prior to joining Dubai Culture, Badri was a senior advisor on strategic communications for ADNOC, the 12th largest oil and gas company in the world. She oversaw the management of strategic communications, while managing several projects that reflected positively on the company’s brand image, value and equity. 

During her tenure with ADNOC she was also seconded to the National Media Council as a senior consultant to oversee the content strategy and visitor experience for the UAE National Pavilion at Expo 2020 Dubai. 

Before ADNOC, she spent 11 years at UAE’s second telecommunications company, Du, as the Executive Vice President of Brand and Communications. 

While at Du, Badri passionately championed the creation of an enhanced, end-to-end brand and communications experience. Her efforts resulted in a cohesive brand strategy for the telecom operator that was then worth over AED 2 billion, making it the fourth most valuable telecommunications brand in the region in 2016. 

In order to link strategic vision with employee productivity, Badri orchestrated several initiatives to nurture the next generation of Emirati visionaries. Throughout her career, she led communications teams containing the highest number of Emirati employees, many of whom progressed from graduate trainees to mid-management and director-level roles. 

A staunch advocate of social responsibility and the driving force behind the execution of long-term sustainability goals, Badri headed the first implementation of Social Return on Investment (SROI) for any telecom in the region in 2014.

Board Memberships
Hala Badri’s passion extends to female empowerment and she has championed women in ICT throughout her career, breaking stereotypes along the way. 

In addition to her current role as Director General of Dubai Culture and Arts Authority, she also occupies the following positions:

·        Vice Chairperson for the Dubai Women Establishment Board of Directors 

·        Vice-Chairman of the Hamdan Bin Mohammed Bin Rashid Al Maktoum International Photography Award (HIPA) Board of Trustees. 

·        Member of the Board of Dubai Media Council 

·        Member of the Board of Directors of the Dubai Sports Council 

·        Member of the Board of Trustees of the Higher Colleges of Technology 

·        Member of the Board of Trustees of Rashid and Latifa Schools Establishment 

She also previously assumed board member and director roles for some of Dubai’s leading entities such as Dubai Properties Group, Dubai Cares, Dubai Media Incorporated  and International Media Investments, and Al Jalila Cultural Centre for Children.

Achievements 
Hala Badri is a well-groomed strategic c-suite executive, who has been named as The Holmes Report's 2018 Innovator 25 in EMEA, ranked at 33 of Forbes ME 200 most powerful Arab woman in the World  and at 37 of 100 most powerful Arab business women in Listed Companies to name a few.

She was also named as the 21st most powerful and influential personality in the Middle East’s media, marketing and advertising industry in Communicate magazine’s Power List 2012. 

She was twice awarded the Sheikh Rashid Award for Scientific Excellence, for outstanding academic achievement during her earlier education.

Passion and Aspirations 
Badri has a passion for the arts, with a deeper-rooted interest in interior design, architecture and culinary arts. 

She is inspired by the artists who are able to transform empty spaces, materials and canvases into meaningful artworks, architects who can translate blueprints into magnificent structures, and chefs who can transform a handful of ingredients into culinary delights. 

She believes creativity, imagination and innovation are the driving factors that help empower our aspiring talents and youth. When she's not indulging in the arts, she enjoys keeping active on the padel court.

References 

Year of birth missing (living people)
Living people
Emirati culture
Emirati women in business
Marketing people